Shabda Mara Swabhawma J Nathi is a Gujarati collection of ghazals written by Raeesh Maniar. The book was published by Vishal Publication, Mumbai in May 1998. Maniar wrote all of the ghazals of this book during his practice as a pediatrics.

Content 
The book is consist of 75 ghazals composed in various Arabic metres such as Hazaj, Ramal, Khafif, Majharia, Mutakarib and Mutadarik. The preface of this book has been written by Ramesh Parekh.

Reception 
Maniar was awarded by Shayda Award of 2001 for his works Kafiyanagar and Shabda Mara Swabhawma J Nathi.

References

1998 poetry books
Gujarati-language poetry collections
Indian poetry collections